Kollock may refer to:

In people
 Florence E. Kollock (1848-1925), American Universalist minister and lecturer
 Peter Kollock (1959-2009), American sociologist
 Shepard Kollock (1750-1839), American editor and printer
 Rachel Kollock McDowell (1880-1949), American journalist

In places
 Kollock, South Carolina, USA